Patrick McAuliffe (1 August 1914 – 13 October 1989) was an Irish Labour Party politician. A farmer before entering politics, he was first elected to Cork County Council and served on the Cork County Committee of Agriculture. He contested the 1943 general election for Cork North, but was not elected. 

He was elected to Dáil Éireann as a Labour Party Teachta Dála (TD) for the Cork North constituency at the 1944 general election. From the 1961 general election, he was elected for the Cork North-East constituency. He was re-elected at each subsequent general election until he lost his seat at the 1969 general election.

References

1914 births
1989 deaths
Labour Party (Ireland) TDs
Members of the 12th Dáil
Members of the 13th Dáil
Members of the 14th Dáil
Members of the 15th Dáil
Members of the 16th Dáil
Members of the 17th Dáil
Members of the 18th Dáil
Irish farmers
Politicians from County Cork